List of Memory of the World Register in Iran includes 10 registered works. In 2005, Iran participated in the sixth edition of the World Memory Program for the first time by introducing two works of Shahnameh Baysanghari from Golestan Museum Palace and the endowment letter of Rabe Rashidi from Tabriz Central Library. Iran is one of the leading countries in the field of registration of works, which has so far registered 10 works in the UNESCO World Memory List and is ranked seventh in the world, and is ranked third among Asian countries after Korea and China, and also 70 works Are on the waiting list. The Book of Vandidad, part of the Zoroastrian Bible, is one of the works that have been introduced for registration.

List

References

External links
 
 

Iran
Memory of the World Register in Iran